Silvia Bulfone-Paus (born Silvia Bulfone) is an Italian immunologist, who gained widespread attention in mainstream media for rampant scientific misconduct. 

She is the chair of the Research Center Borstel's Department of Immunology and Cell Biology and also serves as professor of Immunobiology at the University of Manchester School of Medicine. Her position at the Board of Directors of the Research Centre Borstel is currently in “abeyance”.

Personal life
Bulfone-Paus is married to Ralf Paus, a professor in Dermatology at the University of Münster in Germany. Paus also holds a position as Professor of Cutaneous Medicine at the University of Manchester. Bulfone-Paus and Paus have three children.

Work and fraud investigations
Bulfone-Paus specializes her research in the biology of the immune response, especially cytokines and mast cells. Mast cells secrete a substance known as histamine, which produces inflammation. Cytokines are small molecules made of amino acids. These cell-signaling molecules play a role in the immune response and include interferons and interleukins.

Formal investigation
In the fall of 2009, Bulfone-Paus was alerted to potential misconduct in her lab at the Research Centre Borstel by a biologist and one-time post-doctoral student in Paus’ lab. Bulfone-Paus delayed three months before alerting her institution to the allegations in February 2010. A formal investigation was begun in June of the same year.

In July 2010, an anonymous whistleblower(s) began what Nature called a “libelous” “trial-by-internet”. The informer(s) commenced emailing the investigators, other scientists, and politicians, alerting them to instances of fraud in Bulfone-Paus’ laboratory. The anonymous instigator(s) went by several pseudonyms, including Marco Berns, David Hardman, and Fernando Pessoa. Blogs with information regarding the case and the alleged misinformation were posted on a website, hosted in Panama, under the name of Martin Frost. Many expressed their dismay that a colleague would be subjected to such a “smear-campaign”. However, in an editorial in the Lab-Times, the writers express, “Ultimately, we have been left to question whether the ‘Bulfone-Paus stone’ would have actually started rolling without the ‘smear campaign’. To be honest, we doubt it."

The formal investigation committee found evidence of image manipulation in six papers written between 2001 and 2009. The blame was placed upon the shoulders of two post-doctoral students in the lab, Russians Elena Bulanova and Vadim Budagian. The investigators also stated they found no conclusive evidence regarding falsification of data and cleared the six papers on that charge. Bulfone-Paus was listed as either the senior or corresponding author on all six of the publications.

DFG and internal investigation
DFG, the German Research Foundation, a major supplier of research funding in Germany, also initiated an investigation into Bulfone-Paus’ laboratory in 2010.
At the culmination of the formal investigation, the director of the Research Centre Borstel indicated that an internal investigation of the lab was forthcoming, as officials at the center believed a more extensive investigation was warranted. The center commenced its own internal investigation. In December, 2010, officials at the research center made it known they were asking for the retraction of six further papers, written between 1999 and 2005, all authored or co-authored by Silvia Bulfone-Paus. According to a press release from Research Centre Borstel, "manipulation" was admitted in four of the new retractions. The center found two other publications for which they felt retraction was necessary as well. In response to the findings of their investigation, the Research Centre Borstel downsized Bulfone-Paus’ laboratory and decreased the funding of the lab.

In the retraction statement for one of the articles, “A promiscuous liaison between IL-15 and Axl receptor tyrosine kinase in cell death control”, the authors of the paper, minus the two Russian researchers, alleged Bulanova and Budagian performed both the experiments and the data manipulation. The researchers went on to say they believed the results of the experiment were in no way compromised by the fraud.

Retraction notices for all twelve papers continued to appear throughout the months of February and March of 2011.

Reaction of the scientific community
On March 16, 2011, an open letter, written to the Board of Directors at the Research Centre Borstel and signed by twenty-five scientists hailing from all parts of the globe, was published. In this letter, the scientists repeatedly expressed their admiration and respect for Bulfone-Paus and her contributions to scientific research. The writers also lamented that their esteemed colleague was being held as much responsible for the incidents as the two post-doctoral students.

One month later, the Board of Directors of the Research Centre Borstel wrote a reply to the outraged scientists. The letter issues their dismay with the way Bulfone-Paus handled the accusations and her considerable delay before alerting officials at the centre. The letter also states Bulfone-Paus knew of the possibility of misconduct in her laboratory since 2004, when Dr. Wiebauer first brought the issue to her attention. In response to the scientists’ claims that Bulfone-Paus’ considerable and extensive contributions in her field should influence how she was affected by the incident, officials at Borstel said, “Severe failure in one area (as supervisor and responsible senior, corresponding and first author) can hardly be compensated by merits in other areas.”

Further investigation and retractions
In June of 2011, Retraction Watch blog reported Blood had made known to them that they were conducting a review of a paper written by Bulfone-Paus in 1999. The article in question listed Bulfone-Paus as senior author and did not list either of the two previously implicated Russian post-doctoral students as contributor to the paper.

Also in June, the University of Lubeck, in Germany, began investigations into six papers authored by Bulfone-Paus’ husband, Ralf Paus. Of the six articles in question, Bulfone-Paus was listed as co-author on five of them. Neither of the Russian post-doctoral students were listed as co-authors.

In December of the same year, the journal Transplantation stated they were retracting another of Bulfone-Paus’ papers. The article, published in 2000, was retracted because of “inaccurate information” for two figures contained in the paper. As with the article in Blood, Elena Bulanova and Vadim Budagian were not listed as contributing authors.

Retracted articles
 ATP induces P2X7 receptor-independent cytokine and chemokine expression through P2X1 and P2X3 receptors in murine mast cells- Journal of Leukocyte Biology 
 Retraction Notice
 The IL-15Rα Chain Signals Through Association with Syk in Human B Cells- Journal of Immunology 
 Retraction Notice
 Mast Cells Express Novel Functional IL-15 Receptor α Isoforms- Journal of Immunology
 Retraction Notice
 Extracellular ATP Induces Cytokine Expression and Apoptosis through P2X7 Receptor in Murine Mast Cells- Journal of Immunology Retraction Notice
 A promiscuous liaison between IL-15 receptor and Axl receptor tyrosine kinase in cell death control- The EMBO Journal Retraction Notice
 Enhanced Inhibition of Tumour Growth and Metastasis, and Induction of Antitumour Immunity by IL-2-IgG2b Fusion Protein- Scandinavian Journal of Immunology Retraction Notice
 Soluble Interleukin (IL)-15Rα Is Generated by Alternative Splicing or Proteolytic Cleavage and Forms Functional Complexes with IL-15- Journal of Biological Chemistry Retraction Notice
 Soluble Axl Is Generated by ADAM10-Dependent Cleavage and Associates with Gas6 in Mouse Serum- Molecular and Cell Biology Retraction Notice
 Death deflected: IL-15 inhibits TNF-α-mediated apoptosis in fibroblasts by TRAF2 recruitment to the IL-15Rα chain- The FASEB Journal Retraction Notice
 Signaling through P2X7 receptor in human T cells involves p56LCK, MAP kinases, and transcription factors AP-1 and NF-kB- Journal of Biological Chemistry Retraction Notice
 Natural Soluble Interleukin-15Rα Is Generated by Cleavage That Involves the Tumor Necrosis Factor-α-converting Enzyme (TACE/ADAM17)- Journal of Biological Chemistry Retraction Notice
 Reverse Signaling through Membrane-bound Interleukin-15- Journal of Biological Chemistry Retraction Notice
 An Interleukin-2-IgG-Fas Ligand Fusion Protein Suppresses Delayed-Type Hypersensitivity in Mice by Triggering Apoptosis in Activated T Cells as a Novel Strategy for Immunosuppression- Transplantation Retraction Notice

See also 
 List of scientific misconduct incidents

References

Living people
Italian immunologists
Year of birth missing (living people)